Kleinlaudenbach may refer to:

 Kleinlaudenbach (Kahl), a river of Bavaria, Germany, tributary of the Kahl
 Kleinlaudenbach, a subdivision of Kleinkahl, a community in Lower Franconia, Bavaria, Germany